Radare2 (also known as r2) is a complete framework for reverse-engineering and analyzing binaries; composed of a set of small utilities that can be used together or independently from the command line. Built around a disassembler for computer software which generates assembly language source code from machine-executable code, it supports a variety of executable formats for different processor architectures and operating systems.

History 

Radare2 was created in February 2006, aiming to provide a free and simple command-line interface for a hexadecimal editor supporting 64 bit offsets to make searches and recovering data from hard-disks, for forensic purposes. Since then, the project has grown with the aim changed to provide a complete framework for analyzing binaries while adhering to several principles of the Unix philosophy.

In 2009, the decision was made to completely rewrite it, to get around limitations in the initial design. Since then, the project continued to grow, and attracted several resident developers.

In 2016, the first r2con took place in Barcelona, gathering more than 100 participants, featuring various talks about various features and improvements of the framework.

Radare2 has been the focus of multiple presentations at several high-profile security conferences, like the recon, hack.lu, 33c3.

Features and usage 
Radare2 has a steep learning curve since its main executable binaries are operated by command line and does not have a GUI by itself. Originally built around a hexadecimal editor, it has now a multitude of tools and features, and also bindings for several languages. Meanwhile it has a WebUI and the official graphical user interface project for Radare2 is called Iaito.

Static analysis 
Radare2 is able to assemble and disassemble a lot of software programs, mainly executables, but it can also perform binary diffing with graphs, extract information like relocations symbols, and various other types of data. Internally, it uses a NoSQL database named sdb to keep track of analysis information that can be inferred by radare2 or manually added by the user. Since it is able to deal with malformed binaries, it has also been used by software security researchers for analysis purposes.

Dynamic analysis 
Radare2 has a built-in debugger that is lower-level than GDB. It can also interface with GDB and WineDBG to debug Windows binaries on other systems. In addition, it can also be used as a kernel debugger with VMWare.

Software exploitation 
Since it features a disassembler and a low-level debugger, radare2 can be useful to developers of exploits. The software has features which assist in exploit development, such as a ROP gadget search engine and mitigation detection. Because of the software's flexibility and support for many file formats, it is often used by capture the flag teams and other security-oriented personnel.
Radare2 can also assist in creating shellcodes with its 'ragg2' tool, similar to metasploit.

Graphical user interface (GUI) 
Project Iaito has been developed as the first dedicated graphical user interface (GUI) for radare2; it's been forked by Cutter as secondly developed graphical user interface (GUI) for radare2. When the Cutter project was separated from radare2 project in 2020, Iaito was re-developed to be the current official radare2  graphical user interface (GUI) maintained by radare2 project members.

Supported architectures/formats 
 Recognized file formats
 COFF and derivatives, including Win32/64/generic PE
 ELF and derivatives
 Mach-O (Mach) and derivatives
 Game Boy and Game Boy Advance cartridges
 MZ (MS-DOS)
 Java class
 Lua 5.1 and Python bytecode 
 dyld cache dump
 Dex (Dalvik EXecutable) 
 Xbox xbe format
 Plan9 binaries
 WinRAR virtual machine
 File system like the ext family, ReiserFS, HFS+, NTFS, FAT, ...
 DWARF and PDB file formats for storing additional debug information
 Raw binary
 Instruction sets
Intel x86 family
 ARM architecture
 Atmel AVR series
 Brainfuck
 Motorola 68k and H8
 Ricoh 5A22
 MOS 6502
 Smartcard PSOS Virtual Machine
 Java virtual machine
 MIPS: mipsb/mipsl/mipsr/mipsrl/r5900b/r5900l
 PowerPC
 SPARC Family
 TMS320Cxxx series
 Argonaut RISC Core
 Intel 51 series: 8051/80251b/80251s/80930b/80930s
 Zilog Z80
 CR16
 Cambridge Silicon Radio (CSR)
 AndroidVM Dalvik
 DCPU-16
 EFI bytecode
 Game Boy (z80-like)
 Java Bytecode
Malbolge
 MSIL/CIL
 Nios II
 SuperH
 Spc700
 Systemz
 TMS320
 V850
 Whitespace
 XCore

References

Further reading

External links 
 
 Radare2's blog
 radare2 Git repository
 Iaito Git repository

Disassemblers
Cross-platform free software
Debuggers
Free software programmed in C
Software using the LGPL license